The Bohumil Shimek House is a historic building located in Iowa City, Iowa, United States.  The two-story, frame, Folk Victorian structure was built sometime around 1890.  Its significance is its association with Bohumil Shimek.  Initially trained as a civil engineer, he is better known as a naturalist, conservationist, and botany professor at the University of Iowa.  He lived here from 1899 until his death in 1937. These dates coincide with his professional career.  Shimek contributions include establishing the state park system in Iowa, the Iowa Lakeside Laboratory, the American School of Wild Life Protection, and the Upper Mississippi River National Wildlife and Fish Refuge.  He published over 190 scholarly works, and is credited with the discovery of the origins of the Loess Hills.

The house was individually listed on the National Register of Historic Places in 1991.  In 1994 it was included as a contributing property in the Brown Street Historic District.

References

Houses completed in 1890
Victorian architecture in Iowa
Houses in Iowa City, Iowa
National Register of Historic Places in Iowa City, Iowa
Houses on the National Register of Historic Places in Iowa
Individually listed contributing properties to historic districts on the National Register in Iowa